P&O Scottish Ferries ran ferry services between the Scottish mainland and Orkney and Shetland from 1971 to 2002.

History
P&O took over the routes from the long-established North of Scotland, Orkney & Shetland Steam Navigation Company in 1971. They branded their services "P&O Ferries" from 1975 to 1989 and "P&O Scottish Ferries" thereafter. 

The services were taken over by NorthLink Orkney and Shetland Ferries in 2002.

Services

They sailed from Aberdeen to Stromness and Lerwick, and from Scrabster to Stromness.

In keeping with the tradition of the company which preceded them on the route, their vessels were (with one or two exceptions) named after saints, such as the St Clair and the St Magnus.

Fleet
At the end of operations in 2002, the company had four vessels covering the routes:
 St Ola (IV):  Scrabster - Stromness
 St Sunniva (III): Aberdeen - Stromness - Lerwick
 St Clair (V): Aberdeen - Lerwick
 St Rognvald (IV): Freight services, calling at Aberdeen, Stromness, Kirkwall and Lerwick

References

Notes

Bibliography

External links
North of Scotland, Orkney and Shetland Shipping Co.

Transport companies established in 1971
Transport companies disestablished in 2002
Defunct companies of Scotland
Ferries of Scotland
Northern Isles
P&O (company)
Organisations associated with Shetland